Demon King may refer to:

 The Demon King (album), a 2014 release by Demonic Resurrection
 Demon King, a technical death metal band from Nashville, TN, USA
 Demon King Bull, a character in the manga series The Witch's Servant and the Demon Lord's Horns
 Demon King (Doraemon), a character in the film Doraemon: Nobita's New Great Adventure into the Underworld
 Demon King of Chaos, a character in Water Margin, one of the Four Great Classical Novels of Chinese literature
 Demon King Chestra, a character in the fantasy adventure manga Violinist of Hameln
 Demon King of Confusion, a character in the Chinese classical novel Journey to the West
 Demon King Daimao, a Japanese light novel series
 Great Demon King Koopa, the main antagonist of Nintendo's Mario franchise, known as Bowser in English media.
 Demon King Piccolo, a character in the Dragon Ball manga series
 Ox-Demon-King, a character in the 16th century Chinese novel Journey to the West
 Diary of a Demon King, a manhwa (Korean comic)
 Rage of a Demon King, a 1997 novel by Raymond E. Feist
 Oda Nobunaga, a 1500s Japanese samurai and warlord

See also 
 Agaliarept, a demon king in two 1980s computer games by Level 9 Computing in their Middle Earth trilogy
 Balor, a character in Irish mythology
 Dark Lord, a powerful villain or antagonist with evil henchmen
 Demon Lord (disambiguation)
 Finn Bálor, nicknamed the “Demon King” in WWE
 Fomortiis, a character described as a demon king in the Game Boy Advance game Fire Emblem: The Sacred Stones
 King Banasura, a demon king said to have ruled over Banapur, Odisha State, India
 Ravana of Lanka, a demon king in the Hindu epic Ramayana